Dance Nation is a Dutch Electronic Dance Music formation founded in 2001 by songwriters, producers and DJs Rob Janssen & Brad Grobler. Dutch singers and performers Sean & Kim are the live act fronting Dance Nation since their first and highly successful single "Sunshine".

Biography

Early years (2001-2003) 
Dance Nation released their debut single 'Sunshine' in 2001. This was followed by singles such as "Dance", "Words", and "You Take Me Away". In 2004, they switched to the name "Double Nation" due to legal proceedings.
  
In 2003, they also collaborated with The Lovestern Galaktika Project for the single "My First Love".

2003-2005 
In this period, following the label crisis Noculan Music (after inglobed into Jamie Lewis by his Purple Eye Entertainment), that struck not only Dance Nation, but also other trance artists such as Noémi and 666 and the general mutation of the music genres in Europe, going House, Hard House and Elektro, lead Dance Nation to land in Japan, where they still have a great deal of success and their production focused in the last years.
From this moment on, the group had a sort of split life, releasing Trance projects for Japanese market and House ones for the European one. In this climate born singles like "Beachtime" in Japan and "I'm Gonna Get You" and the House/Elektro track "Move Your Love" in Europe.

It's because their production are more Asian based than European, that it is difficult to find their releases outside Japan, both in online and retail stores and it's because of that too that no one knows about the release of two albums and a compilation. Titles are Trance Champion, released in 2005 by the Japanese label Avex Productions, containing all the past-released singles, including "Celebrate Your Life", that, listening to some people, should have been the next single; One Nation in 2007 always by the same label; and Christmas Trance in winter 2006, including a lot of popular Christmas melodies rearranged in Trance style, like Dance Nation always did.

2006 - 2021 
Just before summer 2006 Dance Nation released their single "Ridin' High", which confirmed a general move towards House music sounds of the European market.
An album was going to be produced too, with an undisclosed release date, containing some remixes of their first single, "Sunshine". Remixes were being collected from their numerous fans all over the world but sadly such a remix Lp never happened.
Continuing the house music sound in 2007 they released the single 'Move Your Love', a collaborative rework of the popular year 2000 released 'On The Move' by Barthezz. It was not until two years later that new material were published in the form of the two compilation albums 'Vocal Trance Years 2001-2004 // 2004-2009'. Compilations containing the early singles, 'Move Your Love' as well as additional singles in the form of 'Celebrate Your Life', 'Reach For The Light' and 'I'm Gonna Get You'. In addition popular tracks such as 'Fired Up', 'Lovin Arms' and 'Summer Rain'.

2010 saw the release of the two House singles 'Surround Me' and 'Great Divide', while their collaborative track with dance-project R.I.O. 'Miss Sunshine' was released with great succes in 2011. 'Storm' followed in 2015. The following six years no new original material material was released, although a string of remixes/reworks of their most popular track 'Sunshine' were published throughout those years.

Rise & Shine (2002/2022) 

The Dance Nation track 'Rise & Shine' was originally written and produced back in year 2002. It was written as a potential second single following 'Sunshine', but 'Dance!' was eventually chosen. While the 'Ralphie B Tech Mix' of 'Rise & Shine' was included on the 2002 vinyl 'Dance/Rise & Shine', released by Black Hole Recordings (In Trance We Trust), the additional mixes in the 2022 released digital package have never been published before. Dutch producer & DJ Ralph Barendse (Ralphie B) did a 'Ralphie B's Tech Edit' for the digital release.

Actual situation 2022 

The two main writers and producers of Dance Nation - Rob Janssen and Brad Grobler - are still very much active in own as well as collaborative projects, writing and producing for various artists. 2022 saw the very early Dance Nation singles made digital available - 'Sunshine', 'Dance!', 'Words' and 'You Take Me Away'. In addition 'My First Love' and the never before released 2002 single 'Rise & Shine'. The Dance Nation producer team are currently discussing new releases and in which direction to go sound wise. In addition Brad and Rob still perform live as part of a Dance Nation live formation.

Discography

Singles 
 2001 - "Sunshine"
 2002 - "Dance"
 2002 - "Words"
 2003 - "My First Love" (Lovestern Galaktika Project Meets Dance Nation)
 2003 - "You Take Me Away"
 2005 - "I'm Gonna Get You"
 2005 - "Stop the Seasons in the Sun"
 2005 - "Beachtime"
 2006 - "Reach for the Light"
 2006 - "Move Your Love"
 2007 - "Ridin' High"
 2008 - "Apologize"
 2009 - "Sunshine 2009" (vs Shaun Baker)
 2010 - "Great Divide"
 2010 - "Surround Me"
 2012 - "Storm"
 2022 - "Rise & Shine" (Ralphie B remix released on vinyl only in 2002. The additional mixes of Rise & Shine date from the same time period and have never been published before)

Albums 
 2005 - Trance Champion
 2007 - One Nation
 2008 - Around the world

Compilations 
 2006 - Christmas Trance
 2009 - Vocal Trance Years 2001-2004
 2009 - Vocal Trance Years 2005-2009

Extra 
 2002 - "Joy to the World" (lately added in the Christmas Trance compilation)
 2002 - "Merry X-Mas (War is Over)" (lately added in the Christmas Trance compilation)
 2004 - "Beethoven's 9th Symphony" (never added to an official release)

Track listing

Singles
Sunshine (2001)
 Sunshine (Original Vocal Radio Edit)
 Sunshine (Original Vocal Mix)
 Sunshine (Wippenberg Remix)
 Sunshine (Kevin C. Cox Remix)
 Sunshine (Alien Factory Remix)
 Sunshine (Bradski & Jenski Mix)

Dance (2002)
Dance (Radio Mix)
Dance (Extended Mix)
Dance (Original Mix)
Dance (DJ Team Trance Mix)
Dance (Fire & Ice Remix)
Dance (Magik Muzik Remix)

Words (2002)
Original Radio Edit
Bradski & Jenski Radio Edit
Album Version
Original Extended Mix
Bradski & Jenski Extended Mix
Noémi Remix
Magik Muzik Remix
You (Bonus Track)

My First Love (2003)
Single Edit
Extended Version
Axel Coon Remix
Bradsky & Jensky Remix

You Take Me Away (2003)
Radio Edit
Video Edit
Original Extended Mix
Bradski & Jenski Dub Mix
Flashrider Remix
Master Blaster Remix
Blair Bitch Remix

Stop the Seasons in the Sun (2005)
Radio Edit
Extended Mix

I'm Gonna Get You (2005)
Radio Edit
Extended Vocal Mix
Bradski & Jenski Remix
DJ Zany Remix
Chew Fu Phat Remix

Beachtime (2005)
Radio Edit
Extended Mix

Move Your Love (2005)
Move Your Love Radio Mix 
Inspiration Vibes Radio Mix
Extended Radio Mix
Inspiration Vibes Extended Mix
Dance Nation DJ Extended Mix
Schampoo Remix
Beholder & Ballistic Remix

Reach for the Light (2006)
Dance Nation Radio Mix
Dance Nation Extended Mix
HardStyle Remix

Ridin' High (2007)
Radio Edit
Original Extended Mix
Hi_Tack Remix

Great Divide (2010)
Radio Edit
Radio Extended Mix
Frontier Remix
Dub Extended
Manox Radio Edit
Manox Extended Remix
Sun Kidz Radio Cut
Sun Kidz Extended Mix
Mauricio Black Remix

Storm (2012)
Storm (Vocal Extended)
Storm (Extended Yaroon Remix)
Storm (Vocal Extended Ryan Watts Remix)
Storm (Frontier Extended Mix)
Storm (Radio Edit)

Rise & Shine (2022)
Rise & Shine (Original Radio Edit)
Rise & Shine (Vocal Trance Radio Edit)
Rise & Shine (Ralphie B's Tech Edit)
Rise & Shine (DJ Team Edit)
Rise & Shine (Vocal Extended Mix)
Rise & Shine (Bradski & Jenski Vocal Trance Mix)
Rise & Shine (Ralphie B's Tech Mix)

Albums
Trance Champion (2005)
Sunshine (Japanese Live Mix)
Seasons in the Sun (Japanese Live Mix)
Beachtime (Japanese Live Mix)
Wa Is Not
Livin' on a Prayer
You Take Me Away
Move Your Love
Please Don't Go
I'm Gonna Get You
Rise and Shine
Dance
Celebrate Your Life
Words
Falling for You
Move Your Love (Sham-Poo Remix)
Sunshine (Wippenberg Remix)
Oh Summer Vacation (Extended Mix)

One Nation (2007)
Zip
Sunshine 2006 (Shohei Matsumoto Remix)
Reach for the Light
Ridin' High
Everybody's Free
In the Summertime
Pump This Party
Higher than Love
Let Love Shine
You Lift Me Up
Fired Up
Bring Back Your Love
Move Your Love (Sham-Poo Remix)
Have Yourself a Merry Little Christmas
Livin' on a Prayer
Ridin' High (Hi_Tack Remix)
Footloose

Around the world (2008)
Sunshine (Dance Nation DJ team Radio edit)
Superstar
Set me free
Mobe your love
Sunlight
Beautiful
Rush
V.I.P.
Take me
I believe
Feel the power
Reach for you
One million reasons
Sunlight (hyper trance mix)
Move your love (Shohei Matsumoto Remix)
Real thing (DJ Tora Remix)

Compilations
Christmas Trance (2006)

Bonuses

References

External links 
Official Website (Dance Nation) (2007 archived copy)

Dutch dancers
Dutch musical groups
Dutch trance music groups
Dance groups
Musical groups established in 2001
2001 establishments in the Netherlands